Glipa aurata is a species of beetle in the genus Glipa. It was described in 1930.

References

aurata
Beetles described in 1930